Ebon Peak is a mountain located on the border of Alberta and British Columbia. It was named in 1917 by Arthur O. Wheeler.

See also
List of peaks on the Alberta–British Columbia border
Mountains of Alberta
Mountains of British Columbia

References

Ebon Peak
Ebon Peak
Canadian Rockies